Miller v Miller 2006 (House of Lords) is a divorce (property settlement) case between Alan Miller and Melissa Miller. He is an asset manager in the City of London who had a fortune of some £30m (per The Times - which says 17.5m in property plus 18.5 in shares). Melissa was entitled to £5 million of her former husband's assets after just two years and nine months of marriage, no children, the Law Lords ruled.
Five Law Lords agreed that the benchmark for division should be equal shares - save in certain circumstances - no matter how short the marriage. They said that to achieve fairness at the end of a marriage, the courts should look to three main considerations: financial needs, compensation, and equal sharing.

McFarlane v McFarlane [2006] was a conjoined appeal. This case similarly dealt with a high earning husband, but it concerned a long term marriage. At issue was the wife's periodic payments as compensation for the disparity in earning capacity that existed at the end of the marriage. The wife was awarded 250,000 p.a. for 5 years and potentially for life. There were children in that case.

Notes

English family case law
House of Lords cases
2006 in case law
2006 in British law
Divorce law in the United Kingdom